Eilema sokotrensis is a moth of the subfamily Arctiinae. It was described by George Hampson in 1900. It is found in Yemen.

References

 

sokotrensis
Moths described in 1900